The Church of Ichuac –  – is a Catholic church in the town of Ichuac, commune of Puqueldón, on Lemuy Island, Chiloé Archipelago, southern Chile.

The Church of Ichuac was declared a National Monument of Chile in 1999 and is one of the 16 Churches of Chiloé that were declared UNESCO World Heritage Sites on 30 November 2000.

In the early 1990s, the local community in Ichuac joined to coordinate reparations on the church and it is currently considered to be in good condition. The patron saint of the church is the Virgin of Candelaria, whose feast day is celebrated on February 2.

This church belongs to the parish of San Pedro Nolasco, Puqueldón, one of the 24 parishes that form the Diocese of Ancud.

See also
Churches of Chiloé

References 

Wooden churches in Chile
Churches in Chiloé Archipelago
World Heritage Sites in Chile
Roman Catholic churches in Chile
Colonial architecture in Chile